Nigel Sears (born 4 April 1957) is a British tennis coach, best known for coaching former top five players Amanda Coetzer, Daniela Hantuchová and Ana Ivanovic during his long career.

Playing career
Sears reached a career high singles ranking of World No. 382 on 4 January 1982, and a career high doubles ranking of World No. 581 on 2 January 1984. He lost his only professional singles match, but won two of the ten professional doubles matches he played.

Coaching career
Nigel Sears started coaching Slovakia's Daniela Hantuchová in 2001. Under his guidance, Hantuchová reached the world's top ten, won the Indian Wells tournament in California (though that would be her only career title until exactly five years later) and reached three consecutive Grand Slam quarter-finals between the 2002 Wimbledon Championships and the 2003 Australian Open (losing twice to Serena Williams and once to Venus Williams respectively).

It was during 2003 that the coaching relationship between Sears and Hantuchová started to come into question. At the French Open, Hantuchová lost a marathon second round match to Ashley Harkleroad in which she made over 100 unforced errors, which led to Sears publicly criticising her attitude. Having reached a career high ranking of World No. 5 earlier in the year, Hantuchová's results continued to deteriorate and by the end of the year she had dropped to No. 17, leading to a decision to temporarily split with Sears.

Sears and Hantuchová reunited in 2004, but on-court results did not improve, as Hantuchová further slipped down to World No. 54 before a late season resurgence saw her finish the season ranked World No. 31 and with an even win–loss record (24 wins and 24 losses).

The pair split permanently in 2006, after which Sears was appointed the captain of the Great Britain Fed Cup team.

In June 2011, Sears was appointed the head coach of former WTA World No. 1 Ana Ivanovic, with a view of reviving her ailing career. Since his appointment, Ivanovic's performances at Grand Slam tournaments improved, and at the 2012 US Open she was finally able to reach her first quarter-final at that level since winning the 2008 French Open.

However, success was hard to come by, with Ivanovic being unable to beat top ten players on a regular basis and having reached a final since November 2011, and having suffered many heavy defeats along the way (Ivanovic has suffered five 6–0 set losses since July 2012, including a double-bagel loss at the 2012 Rogers Cup). This led to questions being asked about Ivanovic's progress since appointing Sears as coach in 2011.

Sears was sacked as Ivanovic's coach following Wimbledon 2013, in which Ivanovic was defeated in the second round by Eugenie Bouchard. The promise that Sears planned in trying to revive Ivanovic's career was never delivered, as she was only able to win one title, regularly failed to beat players ranked above her and was bageled (lost 6–0) five times, in addition to failing to reach a single final in 2012.

In July 2015 Sears was reappointed by Ivanovic. During the 2016 Australian Open Sears collapsed in the stands whilst watching an Ivanovic match. He was taken to hospital, but released the following morning. He subsequently laid the blame on an allergic reaction to sushi. The partnership ended for a second time with Ivanovic's retirement from tennis in December 2016.

Sears began working with Ekaterina Makarova in the summer of 2017. in June 2018 he began coaching the Estonian player Anett Kontaveit but that arrangement came to an end in April 2021.

Sears was a regular commentator for BT Sport, who used to cover the WTA in the UK.

Personal life
Sears resides in the south of England. He is married and has two children. His daughter, Kim, married tennis player Andy Murray in 2015.

References

External links
 

1957 births
Living people
English tennis coaches
Place of birth missing (living people)
British male tennis players